Bruce Gordon was an actor who appeared in and directed the 1919 film The First Men in the Moon.

He was born in Johannesburg, South Africa.

Partial filmography

 Democracy (1918)
 All Men Are Liars (1919)
 After Many Days (1919)
 The First Men in the Moon (1919)
 The Forbidden Valley (1920)
 Bring Him In (1921)
 The Timber Queen (1922)
 Kentucky Days (1923)
 Let's Go (1923)
 Ruth of the Range (1923 serial)
 The Fortieth Door (1924)
 The Fatal Mistake (1924)
Judgment of the Storm (1924)
 Tainted Money (1924)
 Midnight Molly (1925)
 Smooth as Satin (1925)
 Three of a Kind (1925)
 The Vanishing American (1925)
 Brand of Cowardice (1925)
 Gold and the Girl (1925)
 Pals in Paradise (1926)
 Beyond the Rockies (1926)
 Bucking the Truth (1926)
Moran of the Mounted (1926)
 The Dangerous Dude (1926)
 Stick to Your Story (1926)
 The Speed Limit (1926)
 The Escape (1926)
 Blazing Days (1927)
 Desert Dust (1927)
 Isle of Sunken Gold (1927)
 The Sonora Kid (1927)
 Under the Tonto Rim (1928)
 Anybody Here Seen Kelly? (1928)
 The Tiger's Shadow (1928)
 The Fire Detective (1929)
 The Clean Up (1929)
 Elephant Boy (1937)
 Song of the Forge (1937)

External links

Year of birth missing
Year of death missing
South African male film actors
Place of death missing
People from Johannesburg